The Conference of Regions and Autonomous Provinces, originally named "Conference of Presidents of Regions and Autonomous Provinces", is a political body of coordination between the Regions of Italy and, chiefly, their presidents.

The Conference, established in Pomezia, Lazio on 15–16 January 1981, is composed of 21 members, including the representatives of the autonomous provinces of Trentino and South Tyrol, which form the Region of Trentino-Alto Adige/Südtirol.

The priorities that led to the establishment of the Conference were:
improving the collaboration and consultation with the Government through the elaboration of documents shared by the whole "system of regional governments";
establishing a permanent interregional consultation to favour the spread of "best practices";
representing the "system of regional governments" externally and through institutional relations;
underlining the role of the regional institution in the creation of the European Union.

The Conference's was increased following the establishment by the Italian government of the State–Regions Conference (1983) and the Unified State–Regions, Cities and Local Autonomous Conference (1997), the latter being the joint meeting of the State–Regions Conference and the State–Cities and Local Autonomous Conference (1997). Since then, the Conference of Regions and Autonomous Provinces has been the official seat of interregional institutional dialogue. In fact, joint documents are prepared by the Conference and are later presented during the meetings of the State-Regions Conference and the Unified Conference.

List of members

List of presidents
This is the list of presidents of the Conference since 1995. Before then, the role was rotational.

See also
Official website

References

Regions of Italy